The American Osteopathic Board of Family Physicians (AOBFP) is an organization that provides board certification to qualified osteopathic physicians (D.O.) who specialize in delivering comprehensive primary care for patients of all ages, genders, and addressing all parts of the body (family physicians). The board is one 18 medical specialty certifying boards of the American Osteopathic Association Bureau of Osteopathic Specialists approved by the American Osteopathic Association (AOA), and was established in 1972. As of April 2012, 6,344 osteopathic family physicians held active certification with the AOBFP.

Board certification
Initial certification is available to osteopathic family physicians who have successfully completed an AOA-approved residency in family medicine, two years of practice, successful completion of written and oral exams, and chart review.

Voluntary recertification was first offered in Fall 1994, and mandatory recertification began in March 1997. Before this time, the initial board certification was permanent and recertification was not required. Since March 1997, if a physician does not recertify every eight years, their board certification status expires.

Osteopathic family physicians may also receive Certification of Added Qualifications (CAQ) in the following areas: 
Geriatrics 
Sports medicine 
Addiction medicine 
Hospice and palliative care 
Sleep medicine  
Hyperbaric medicine

The Certification of Added Qualifications must be maintained through the process of recertification every 10 years.

For an osteopathic physician to be board-certified in any specialty, they must be AOA members, pay certification fees, and complete at least 120 hours of continuing medical education in a three-year period.

See also
 American Board of Family Medicine
 American College of Osteopathic Family Physicians
 AOA Bureau of Osteopathic Specialists

References

External links
 AOBFP homepage
 American Osteopathic Association

Osteopathic medical associations in the United States
Organizations established in 1972
Family medicine in the United States
Medical and health organizations based in Illinois
General practice organizations